The Cabell Standard was an independent, weekly newspaper covering Cabell County, West Virginia. The paper was first printed in 1898 in Milton, West Virginia by James R. Dudley. Until 2006, the paper was published as "The Cabell Record."

The paper published its last issue on April 2, 2015 after going out of business. Before that, the paper was every Thursday by Stadelman Publishing, which purchased the paper in 2013.

External links
 The Cabell Standard Website
 The Cabell Standard on Facebook

References

Newspapers published in West Virginia
Cabell County, West Virginia
Publications established in 1898
1898 establishments in West Virginia